Catocala proxeneta is a moth in the family Erebidae first described by Sergei Alphéraky in 1895. It is found in Mongolia and the Russian Far East (Ussuri).

Subspecies
Catocala proxeneta proxeneta
Catocala proxeneta sutschana Sheljuzhko, 1943 (Ussuri)

References

proxeneta
Moths described in 1895
Moths of Asia